Sylvester was Greek Orthodox Patriarch of Antioch (1724–1766), the first patriarch after the Catholic schism.

Literature

External links
 Primates of the Apostolic See of Antioch

Greek Orthodox Patriarchs of Antioch
18th-century Eastern Orthodox archbishops